was a Japanese actor from Arakawa, Tokyo. He graduated from Komagome Senior High School and Tokai University Second Faculty of Engineering. He was represented with Gift.

Death

Izumi died on the afternoon of 28 July 2015 at the age of 35 and had been under medical care from an unspecified illness.

Filmography

Television

Films

Stage

Video games

Works

Photo albums

DVD

CD

References

External links
 – Gift 
 – Ameba Blog 

Male actors from Tokyo
1980 births
2015 deaths
Tokai University alumni
21st-century Japanese male actors
Japanese male television actors
Japanese male film actors